Palacenti was an ancient town of Drangiana in southwest Afghanistan. It is located above Tazarene on the Etymandrus river.

References
 Classical Gazetteer

Former populated places in Afghanistan